Kahshang Rural District is in the Central District of Birjand County, South Khorasan province, Iran. At the National Census of 2006, its population was 3,991 in 1,155 households. There were 3,338 inhabitants in 1,092 households at the following census of 2011. At the most recent census of 2016, the population of the rural district was 3,737 in 1,210 households. The largest of its 49 villages was Marak, with 569 people.

References 

Birjand County

Rural Districts of South Khorasan Province

Populated places in South Khorasan Province

Populated places in Birjand County